Klaudia Szemereyné Pataki (née Pataki; born 4 March 1976) is a Hungarian politician, member of the National Assembly (MP) from Fidesz Bács-Kiskun County Regional List from 2013-14.

She graduated from the Corvinus University of Budapest in 2007, after that she participated in a further education at the University of Exeter in 2011. She served as leader of the Fidesz group in the General Assembly of Kecskemét between 2006 and 2010. She currently serves as deputy mayor for economic affairs since 2008. She functioned as Ministerial Commissioner for Automotive Course, Research and Development between 6 December 2012 and 3 March 2013.

Szemereyné Pataki became MP for Bács-Kiskun County in April 2013, replacing her distant relative György Matolcsy, who was appointed Governor of the Hungarian National Bank, and as a result he resigned from his parliamentary seat on 3 March 2013.

Szemerey-Pataki became interim mayor of Kecskemét on 24 June 2014, replacing fellow Fidesz member Gábor Zombor. She was elected mayor with full term in the 2014 local election. She was re-elected mayor in the 2019 local elections, obtaining 50.21 percent of the vote.

Personal life
She is married to Szabolcs Szemerey. They have two daughters, Szinta and Szelina.

References

1976 births
Living people
Hungarian economists
Fidesz politicians
Members of the National Assembly of Hungary (2010–2014)
Women members of the National Assembly of Hungary
Mayors of places in Hungary
People from Kecskemét
Corvinus University of Budapest alumni
21st-century Hungarian women politicians